Jan Müller may refer to:

 Jan Müller (artist) (1922–1958), New York figurative expressionist of the 1950s
Jan Harmensz. Muller (1571–1628), Flemish engraver and painter
 Jan Allan Müller (born 1969), Faroese football striker
 Jan Müller, trans music producer with X-Dream
Jan Müller (executive) (1967), CEO of the National Film and Sound Archive of Australia

See also
 Jan Müller-Wieland (born 1966), German composer and conductor of classical music